The following is a list of notable deaths in February 1997.

Entries for each day are listed alphabetically by surname. A typical entry lists information in the following sequence:
 Name, age, country of citizenship at birth, subsequent country of citizenship (if applicable), reason for notability, cause of death (if known), and reference.

February 1997

1
Simion Bughici, 82, Romanian politician.
Herb Caen, 80, American journalist and columnist for the San Francisco Chronicle, lung cancer.
Heiner Carow, 67, German film director and screenwriter.
Ed Danowski, 85, American football player.
Mitchell Goodman, 73, American writer, teacher, and activist.
William Kintner, 81, American soldier, foreign policy analyst, and diplomat.
Kiki Kogelnik, 62, Austrian painter, sculptor and printmaker, cancer.
Thelma Moss, 79, American actress, psychologist and parapsychologist.
Lillian Porter, 79, American film and television actress.
Marjorie Reynolds, 79, American actress and dancer, heart failure.
Bo Russell, 81, American gridiron football player.
Francisco Tobar García, 68, Ecuadorian poet, playwright, journalist, and diplomat, lung cancer.
Wilcomb E. Washburn, American historian, prostate cancer.

2
Godfrey Baseley, 92, British radio executive.
Raúl de Anda, 88, Mexican actor, screenwriter, film producer and director.
Erich Eliskases, 83, Austrian-Argentinian chess grandmaster.
Qin Jiwei, 82, Chinese general and member of the Politburo.
Sanford Meisner, 91, American actor and acting teacher.
Art Merewether, 94, American baseball player.
Martin Mussgnug, 60, German politician.
Raimundo Saporta, 70, Spanish club basketball administrator.
Chico Science, 30, Brazilian singer and composer, car accident.
Theodoros Stamos, 74, Greek-American painter.
Seán Ó Síocháin, 82, Irish Gaelic footballer, hurler, and broadcaster.

3
Boris de Rachewiltz, 70, Italian-Russian egyptologist and writer.
Jerry Beit haLevi, 84, Israeli football player and manager.
Bohumil Hrabal, 82, Czech writer, fall.
Agi Jambor, 87, Hungarian-American pianist.
Stan Kostka, 84, American football player and coach.
Harry H. Wachtel, 79, American lawyer and civil rights activist, Parkinson’s disease.
Mikhail Yakushin, 86, Russian football player and manager.

4
Henry H. Barschall, 81, German-American physicist.
Robert Clouse, 68, American film director and producer (Enter the Dragon), kidney failure.
Benjamin David de Jesus, 56, Philippine prelate of the Catholic Church, murdered.
Ross Lee Finney, 90, American composer.
Paulo Francis, 66, Brazilian journalist, novelist and critic, heart attack.
Robi Ghosh, 65, Indian actor.
A R Mallick, 78, Bangladeshi historian and educationist.
Alek Rapoport, 63, Russian nonconformist artist.
James Tattersall, 56, British tennis player.
Cyril Toumanoff, 83, Russian-American historian.
Darrell Tully, 79, American football player and coach.

5
Frederick J. Almgren, Jr., 63, American mathematician, complication following surgery.
Bob Brown, 58, Canadian professional wrestler ("Bulldog" Bob Brown).
Robert Elem, 69, American blues guitarist and singer.
Dorothy Fosdick, 83, American foreign policy expert.
Pamela Harriman, 76, English-American political activist, diplomat, and socialite, cerebral hemorrhage.
René Huyghe, 90, French art historian.
Jürgen Neukirch, 59, German mathematician.
Harry Trotsek, 84, American Thoroughbred racehorses trainer and owner.

6
Ernie Anderson, 73, American disc jockey, and television and radio announcer, cancer.
Harry Essex, 86, American screenwriter and director.
Roger Laurent, 83, Belgian racing driver.
Riza Lushta, 81, Kosovar Albanian football striker.

7
Nina Albright, 89, American comic book artist.
Owen Aspinall, 69, American politician and Governor of American Samoa.
John Baker, 59, British musician and composer.
Sam DeCavalcante, 84, American mobster, heart attack.
Allan Edwall, 72, Swedish actor, author, composer and singer, prostate cancer.
Maynard Pirsig, 95, American legal scholar.
Daniil Shafran, 74, Soviet/Russian cellist.
Rösli Streiff, 96, Swiss alpine skier and world champion.
Jose Garcia Villa, 88, Filipino poet, novelist, and painter.
Mary Wills, 82, American costume designer, kidney failure.

8
Nathan Lerner, 83, American photographer.
Henry Margenau, 95, German-American physicist and philosopher of science.
Robert Ridgely, 65, American actor (Philadelphia, Beverly Hills Cop II, Blazing Saddles), cancer.
Corey Scott, 28, American motorcycle stunt rider, motorcycle accident.
Michael Voslenski, 76, Soviet and Russian writer, scientist, diplomat and dissident.
Walter Wiora, 90, German musicologist and music historian.

9
David Austick, 76, British politician and bookshop owner.
Brian Connolly, 51, Scottish singer-songwriter, musician and actor.
Taylor Drysdale, 83, American swimmer and swimming coach.
Barry Evans, 53, English actor.
Fritz Grasshoff, 83, German painter, poet and songwriter.
Leni Junker, 91, German sprint runner and Olympian.
Jack Owens, 92, American blues singer and guitarist.
Williams Sassine, 53, Guinean novelist.
Max Tetley, 87, Australian rules footballer.
Luis Velásquez, 77, Guatemalan long-distance runner and Olympian.

10
Harriet Andreassen, 71, Norwegian labour activist and politician.
Conrad M. Arensberg, 86, American anthropologist and scholar, respiratory failure.
Lou Bennett, 70, American jazz organist.
Milton Cato, 81, Saint Vincentian politician and first Prime Minister of Saint Vincent and the Grenadines.
Robert Mallary, 79, American sculptor and computer art pioneer, leukemia.
Jerome Namias, 86, American meteorologist.

11
Nalanda Ellawala, 29, Sri Lankan politician, shot.
Robert A. Graham, 84, American Jesuit priest and historian.
Lewis Jacobs, 92, American screenwriter, film director and critic.
Don Porter, 84, American actor.
Ray Terrell, 77, American gridiron football player.

12
Nora Beloff, 78, English journalist and political writer.
James Cossins, 63, English actor, heart disease.
Francis Healy, 86, American Major League Baseball player.
Ruth Winifred Howard, 96, American psychologist.
Federico Pisani, 22, Italian footballer, car crash.

13
Bobby Adams, 75, American baseball player.
Thies Christophersen, 79, German neo-nazi and Holocaust denier.
Robert Klark Graham, 90, American eugenicist and businessman.
Robert Herman, 82, American scientist.
Don Jordan, 62, American boxer, complications following robbery.
Ernő Rubik, 86, Hungarian aircraft designer.
Reg Ryan, 71, Irish football player.
Atta Shad, 57, Pakistani poet, playwright, and intellectual.

14
Lélia Gousseau, 88, 20th-century French classical pianist.
Jack Matheson, 76, American gridiron football player.
Charles Moffett, 67, American free jazz drummer.
Miguel Rodriguez, 35, Filipino actor and model, pancreatitis.
William L. Scott, 81, American politician, Alzheimer's disease.
Chōbyō Yara, 94, Japanese politician and teacher.
Mohammed Yousuf, 57, Pakistani singer.

15
Oscar Adams, 72, American lawyer and first African-American Alabama Supreme Court justice.
Arne Berg, 87, Swedish road racing cyclist.
Philip Hershkovitz, 87, American mammalogist.
Paul Page, 69, American gridiron football player.
Frode Rinnan, 91, Norwegian architect and politician.
Jack Sparling, 80, Canadian comic book artist (Claire Voyant, Strange Adventures, Ghost Rider).

16
Abd al-Fattah Abu Ghudda, 79, Syrian leader of the Muslim Brotherhood.
Ethel Owen, 103, American actress.
Alvis Vītoliņš, 50, Latvian chess master, suicide.
Jack Wilson, 82, British rower and Olympic champion.
Chien-Shiung Wu, 84, Chinese-American experimental physicist, watershed stroke.

17
Spartaco Bandinelli, 75, Italian boxer and Olympian.
Kenny Graham, 72, British jazz saxophonist, arranger and composer.
Leonard Ho, 72, Hong Kong film producer.
Ichimaru, 90, Japanese recording artist and geisha.
Bärbel Inhelder, 83, Swiss psychologist.
Joe Kieyoomia, 77, American Navajo prisoner of war during World War II.
Darcy Ribeiro, 74, Brazilian anthropologist, historian, sociologist, author and politician, cancer.
Georg L. Samuelsen, 87, Faroese editor and voice actor.

18
Bozorg Alavi, 93, Iranian writer, novelist, and intellectual, heart attack.
Enrique Peralta Azurdia, 88, President of Guatemala.
Antonio de Almeida, 69, French conductor and musicologist, lung cancer, liver cancer.
Gerd Domhardt, 51, German composer.
Eric Fenby, 90, English composer, conductor, pianist and organist.
Reggie Forte, 47, American activist and founding member of the Black Panther Party.
Jnan Prakash Ghosh, 87, Indian harmonium and tabla player and musicologist.
Emily Hahn, 92, American journalist and author.
Austin Knickerbocker, 78, American baseball player.
Geoffrey Swaebe, 86, American diplomat and ambassador, complications of pneumonia.

19
David Ashkenazi, 81, Russian pianist, accompanist and composer.
Jarmil Burghauser, 75, Czech composer, conductor, and musicologist.
Frank Delfino, 86, American actor, bone marrow cancer.
Buddy Edelen, 59, American marathon runner.
António Gedeão, 90, Portuguese poet, essayist, writer and playwright.
Yutaka Haniya, 87, Japanese writer and critic.
Karin Magnussen, 89, German nazi eugenicist, biologist, and researcher during World War II.
Lois Marshall, 73, Canadian soprano.
Leo Rosten, 78, American humorist.
Edsall Walker, 86, American Negro league baseball player.
Deng Xiaoping, 92, Chinese politician leader of the People's Republic of China, complications of lung infections.

20
Ruth Clark (pollster), American pollster and researcher.
Afonsinho, 82, Brazilian football player.
Paul Anxionnaz, 94, French politician.
Zachary Breaux, 36, American jazz guitarist, drowned.
Pierre Gascar, 80, French journalist, literary critic, writer, and screenwriter.
Thomas G. Kavanagh, 79, American judge, Chief Justice of the Michigan Supreme Court (1975–1979).
Arthur Machado, 88, Brazilian football player and manager.
Stan Pearson, 78, English footballer.

21
Ziya Bunyadov, 73, Azerbaijani historian and scientist, murdered.
Luitgard Im, 67, German actress.
Choe Kwang, 78, North Korean army general and politician, heart attack.
Mohamed Nasir, 81, Malaysian politician.
Merle Pertile, 55, American model and actress.
Josef Posipal, 69, Romanian-German footballer, heart failure.
Kenneth Rowntree, 81, British artist.
Leo Sjogren, 82, American racewalker and Olympian.
Eleanor Butler, Lady Wicklow, 82, Irish politician and architect.

22
Joseph Aiuppa, 89, American mobster.
Urmila Bhatt, 62/63, Indian actress, murdered.
William Karush, 79, American mathematician.
James A. Lewis, 63, American Libertarian Party politician.
Harold Nichols, 79, American wrestler and wrestling coach.
Albert Shanker, 68, American labor leader, bladder cancer.
Charlie Toogood, 69, American gridiron football player.

23
Abdelkader Ben Bouali, 84, French football player.
Gordon Glisson, 66, American jockey.
Ephraim P. Holmes, 88, United States Navy admiral.
Frank Launder, 91, British writer, film director and producer.
Oscar Lewenstein, 80, British theatre and film producer.
Olivier Masson, 74, French linguist.
Jack Slater, 69, Australian politician.
Tony Williams, 51, American jazz drummer, heart attack.

24
Astrid Fagraeus, 83, Swedish immunologist.
Nils-Olof Franzén, 80, Swedish writer.
Wolfgang Heinrich Johannes Fuchs, 81, British  mathematician.
Raymond Lambert, 72, Swiss mountaineer, complications of a lung disorder.
Isabelle Lucas, 69, Canadian-British actress and singer, heart attack.
Ernest C. Pollard, 90, British professor of physics and biophysics, stroke.
Len Vlahov, 56, Australian discus thrower, cancer.
Ion Voicu, 73, Romanian violinist and orchestral conductor.

25
Cal Abrams, 72, American baseball player, heart attack.
Hoss Allen, 74, American radio disc jockey.
Louis Auslander, 68, American mathematician.
Earle Edwards, 88, American football player and coach.
Scott Forbes, 76, British actor and screenwriter.
Yi Han-yong, 36, North Korean defector, murdered.
Arthur Hewlett, 89, British actor.
Danielle de St. Jorre, 55, Seychelles politician.
Ugo Poletti, 82, Italian Cardinal of the Roman Catholic Church, heart attack.
Ted Roach, 87, Australian trade unionist and member of the Communist Party of Australia.
Andrei Sinyavsky, 71, Russian writer and Soviet dissident.
John Williams, 70, Australian politician.

26
Nuccio Bertone, 82, Italian automobile designer and constructor.
Mildred Clingerman, 78, American science fiction author.
David Doyle, 67, American actor (Charlie's Angels, Capricorn One, Rugrats).
Vincent Gaddis, 83, American author.
Giovanni Ghiselli, 62, Italian sprinter and Olympian.
Andy Houts, 31, American actor, cardiac arrest.
Joseph Anthony Lefante, 68, American politician.
Tom O'Connor, 78, Irish Gaelic footballer.
Ben Raleigh, 83, American lyricist and composer.
Wende Wagner, 55, American actress (The Green Hornet, Rosemary's Baby, Destination Inner Space), cancer.

27
Kingsley Davis, 88, American sociologist and demographer.
Patricia Felicien, 30, Saint Lucian cricket player.
William Gear, 81, Scottish painter.
Indeevar, 73, Indian film lyricist.
Alpo Jaakola, 67, Finnish painter and sculptor.
Mieczysław Jagielski, 73, Polish politician and economist, heart attack.
Kim Kwang-jin, 69, North Korean general and politician.
Harry Love, 85, American animator, effects animator, and writer, heart attack.
William R. Maples, 59, American forensic anthropologist, brain cancer.
Edward J. McCormack, Jr., 73, American lawyer and politician, complications from lung cancer.

28
Osvaldo Bailo, 84, Italian road cyclist.
Donald Carrick, 90, Canadian lawyer, politician, sportsman and Olympian.
Harold Dean, 84, Australian politician.
Mohammad Moustafa Haddara, 67, Arabic scholar and writer.
Örjan Martinsson, 60, Swedish football player.
Giuseppe Migneco, 89, Italian painter.
Larry Tillman, 88, American professional wrestler and promoter.
Hal Turpin, 93, American baseball player.

References 

1997-02
 02